The WCPW League Championship was a professional wrestling heavyweight championship in Windy City Pro Wrestling (WCPW). It replaced the WCPW Heavyweight Championship as the promotion's main singles title in 1993, following the creation of its weight-class division, and continued to be defended until 2008 when it was unified with the Heavyweight and Bare Knuckles Championships to create the "WCPW World Heavyweight Championship". The League Championship was brought back during the promotion's final year with the intention of it being defended against by wrestlers from other promotions. It remained active until December 16, 2010 when WCPW merged with Chicago Pro Wrestling Academy to form Dynasty Sports Entertainment.

The inaugural champion was Mike Anthony, who defeated Kevin Quinn in a tournament final on May 22, 1993 to become the first WCW League Champion. Anthony, Terry Allen, and Steve Boz are tied for the record for most reigns, with three each. At 714 days, Steve Boz's first reign is the longest in the title's history. Abaddon's only reign was the shortest in the history of the title winning a Fatal Four Way match involving Acid Jaz, Marshe Rockett, and Justin Adams only to lose it to Curse on the same night. Coincidentally, he defeated the last champion, Sean Mulligan, on May 17, 2008 at Battle of the Belts 20 to unify the Bare Knuckles, Heavyweight and League titles. Wrestling under the name "Austin Roberts", he was the promotion's heavyweight champion at the time. Overall, there have been 28 reigns shared between 17 wrestlers, with three vacancies, and 2 deactivations.

Title history
Key

Names

Reigns

Combined reigns

References

External links
WindyCityProWrestling.com
Title History - Windy City Pro Wrestling

League Championship